Grimbergen Abbey is a Premonstratensian monastery in Grimbergen, Flemish Brabant, Belgium, established in 1128 in the place of an earlier foundation of Augustinian Canons.

The abbey itself was dissolved in 1796 in the aftermath of the French Revolution, but the abbey church of Saint Servatius survived as the parish church of Grimbergen. After the French Revolution the abbey was reinstated. The building in its present form dates from 1660. It was elevated to the status of basilica minor in 1999.

Abbots

After the French Revolution 
 48. Jan-Baptist Van Den Bergen (1834–1851) 
 49. Godfried Van Overstraeten (1851–1870)
 50. Ludolphus Van Beveren (1870–1876): Cor unum in Deo
 51. Alexander Van Put (1876–1897) :In dilectione et patientia
 52. Evermodus Lahaise of Lahaize (1897–1915): In te Domine speravi 
 53. Hiëronymus Hoppenbrouwers (1916–1941): Ora et labora
 54. Augustinus Cantinjaeu (1942–1946) : In de vreugde der liefde
 55. Hroznata Van Heesch (1946–1957)
 56. Emiel Louis De Winde (1957–1982)
 57. Werenfried Petrus Wagenaar (1982–2004): In vinculo pacis .
 58. Erik De Sutter (2004–current): Illum oportet crescere.

Other 
Grimbergen is also known for its cheese, bread and beer, although at present its beer is being produced by the Carlsberg Group.. In May 2021 they announced they are now producing their own beer.

References

External links
 Old Archives of Norbertines - Abbey of Grimbergen in ODIS - Online Database for Intermediary Structures 
 New Archives of Norbertines - Abbey of Grimbergen in ODIS - Online Database for Intermediary Structures

Christian monasteries in Flemish Brabant
Premonstratensian monasteries in Belgium
1128 establishments in Europe
1796 disestablishments in Europe